The Coral Gables Woman's Club is a historic woman's club in Coral Gables, Florida. 

The club is located at 1001 East Ponce de Leon Boulevard. On March 27, 1990, it was added to the U.S. National Register of Historic Places.

See also
National Register of Historic Places listings in Miami-Dade County, Florida

References

External links
Official website

 Dade County listings at National Register of Historic Places
 Florida's Office of Cultural and Historical Programs

National Register of Historic Places in Miami-Dade County, Florida
Women's clubs in Florida
Women's club buildings in Florida